Axel Perneczky (1 November 1945 – 24 January 2009) was a renowned Hungarian neurosurgeon, who for the majority of his career, practised neurosurgery in Mainz in Germany. He was a major contributor to the development of endoscopic and minimally invasive neurosurgical procedures, particularly in the field of cerebrovascular neurosurgery.

Dr. Perneckzky was the editor of the journal Minimally Invasive Neurosurgery, published by Thieme.

Works

References

Hungarian neurosurgeons
German neurosurgeons
1945 births
2009 deaths
20th-century Hungarian physicians
20th-century German physicians
20th-century surgeons